Veronica Zappone (born 11 April 1993 in Italy) is an Italian curler from Volvera. She started curling in 2005,

Personal life
As of 2022, Zappone is a law student.

References

External links

1993 births
Living people
People from Segrate
Italian female curlers
Sportspeople from the Metropolitan City of Milan